Plains of the Purple Buffalo, released on June 27, 2011, is the second studio album by *shels.

Track listing
 "Journey To The Plains" – 7:56
 "Plains of the Purple Buffalo (Part 1)" – 3:20
 "Plains of the Purple Buffalo (Part 2)" – 8:31
 "Searching for Zihuatanejo" – 6:11
 "Vision Quest" – 5:16
 "Atoll" – 1:58
 "Butterflies (On Luci's Way)" – 9:04
 "Crown of Eagle Feathers" – 3:39
 "Bastien’s Angels" – 5:50
 "Conqueror" – 5:24
 "The Spirit Horse" – 7:28
 "Waking" – 4:13
 "Leaving the Plains" – 8:02

References

shels albums
2011 albums